The Volta do Rio Grande do Sul (also known as the Volta Ciclística Internacional do Rio Grande do Sul and previously known as Volta Ciclística Internacional de Gravataí) was a stage cycling race held annually from 2009 to 2011 and 2014 to 2016 in Rio Grande do Sul, Brazil. It was rated 2.2 and was held as part of the UCI America Tour.

Winners

References

Cycle races in Brazil
Defunct cycling races in Brazil
2009 establishments in Brazil
Recurring sporting events established in 2009
2016 disestablishments in Brazil
Recurring sporting events disestablished in 2016
Sport in Rio Grande do Sul
UCI America Tour races